Vladan Seric (born 30 July 1981) is a Serbia and Montenegro former footballer who is last known to have played for Singapore Armed Forces of the Singapore S.League in 2005.

Young Lions
Securing a trial with Young Lions of the Singapore S.League in 2004, Seric was ensnared in a mishap in Dubai, where he stopped over, so he arrive in Singapore without luggage. The loan move happened 10 days after he began his trial with Seric adapting well and planning to stay longer in Singapore.

References

Serbian expatriate footballers
Singapore Premier League players
Living people
Young Lions FC players
Serbia and Montenegro expatriate sportspeople in Singapore
FK Teleoptik players
Serbian footballers
Expatriate footballers in Singapore
Association football defenders
1981 births
FK Železničar Beograd players
FK Voždovac players
Warriors FC players
Serbia and Montenegro expatriate footballers